Ludmila Caraman (née Ninicu; born 27 July 1985) is a Moldovan footballer who plays as an attacking midfielder for Women's Championship club Anenii Noi and as a right-back for the Moldova women's national team.

Career
Caraman has been capped for the Moldova national team, appearing for the team during the 2019 FIFA Women's World Cup qualifying cycle.

See also
List of Moldova women's international footballers

References

External links
 

1985 births
Living people
Moldovan women's footballers
Women's association football fullbacks
Women's association football midfielders
Agarista-ȘS Anenii Noi players
Moldova women's international footballers